Paul Rosolie is an American conservationist and author. His 2014 memoir, Mother of God, detailed his work in the Amazon rainforest in southeastern Peru. He was also the host of the Discovery Channel's 2014 nature documentary special, Eaten Alive.

Life and career

Rosolie grew up in the US state of New Jersey. He quit high school during his second year and began attending college. His long-time interest in rainforests led him to an Amazon research station in Peru's Madre de Dios region at age 18 in 2005. That year, he also traveled to Brazil's Atlantic Forest through a study abroad program with Columbia University. In 2007, Rosolie helped create Tamandua Expeditions (with Juan Julio Durand), an ecotourism company that offers trips to the Las Piedras Biodiversity Station on the Las Piedras River. Money raised from that endeavor is used to protect a patch of untouched forest.

Rosolie earned his undergraduate degree in environmental studies from Ramapo College in New Jersey in 2010. While studying there, he spent his breaks flying back to Peru and working with Tamandua Expeditions. In 2013, Rosolie published a short film on YouTube that showed footage of dozens of species of wild animals in the Madre de Dios forests captured on video by various camera traps. The film, titled An Unseen World, won the short film contest at the 2013 United Nations Forum on Forests. Also that year, Rosolie spent time in India researching tiger conservation.

In March 2014, his first book, Mother of God: An Extraordinary Journey into the Uncharted Tributaries of the Western Amazon, was published by HarperCollins. The book detailed his life, experiences, and conservation efforts in the Amazon. In December 2014, he was the host of the Discovery Channel nature documentary special, Eaten Alive. During the program, Rosolie was purportedly going to be swallowed alive by a green anaconda while wearing a custom protective suit. While the anaconda did coil around Rosolie, he was never actually swallowed. The show received criticism from both viewers and animal rights organizations, but Rosolie maintained that he intended to raise money and bring broader public attention to the deforestation, gold mining, and hunting that threaten the anaconda's habitat. He also indicated that he was unaware that the Discovery Channel would cut a majority of the conservation-related content from the show.

Beginning in 2015, Rosolie began spending more time on conservation efforts in India. In 2017, he studied the migration habits of tigers and elephants in the forests of Wayanad. As of 2018, he spends four months of the year in south India and splits the remainder of his time in Peru and New York City. In 2019, he is due to release his second book, a literary fiction novel called The Girl and the Tiger. The book is based on the true story of an Indian girl who contacted Rosolie after finding three abandoned tiger cubs.

Bibliography

References

External links
Official website
Tamandua Expeditions

Living people
American male writers
Year of birth missing (living people)
Ramapo College alumni
American conservationists
Writers from New Jersey